Fiorenzo, il terzo uomo is a 1951 Italian comedy film directed by Stefano Canzio.

Cast
 Aldo Fabrizi	 
 Renato Rascel		
 Nino Taranto		
 Mario Siletti		
 Silvio Gigli		
 Raffaele Pisu

External links
 

1951 films
1950s Italian-language films
Italian comedy films
1951 comedy films
Italian black-and-white films
1950s Italian films